Visa requirements for Gambian citizens are administrative entry restrictions imposed on citizens of Gambia by the authorities of other states.
As of 7 April 2020, Gambian citizens had visa-free or visa on arrival access to 68 countries and territories, ranking the Gambian passport 75th in terms of travel freedom (tied with Tanzanian passports) according to the Henley Passport Index.

Visa requirements map

Visa requirements

Dependent, Disputed, or Restricted territories
Unrecognized or partially recognized countries

Dependent and autonomous territories

See also 

 Visa policy of Gambia
 Gambian passport

References and Notes
References

Notes

Gambia
Foreign relations of the Gambia